In fluid dynamics, the Taylor–Green vortex is an unsteady flow of a decaying vortex, which has an exact closed form solution of the incompressible Navier–Stokes equations in Cartesian coordinates. It is named after the British physicist and mathematician Geoffrey Ingram Taylor and his collaborator A. E. Green.

Original work

In the original work of Taylor and Green, a particular flow is analyzed in three spatial dimensions, with the three velocity components  at time  specified by

The continuity equation  determines that . The small time behavior of the flow is then found through simplification of the incompressible Navier–Stokes equations using the initial flow to give a step-by-step solution as time progresses.

An exact solution in two spatial dimensions is known, and is presented below.

Incompressible Navier–Stokes equations
The incompressible Navier–Stokes equations in the absence of body force, and in two spatial dimensions, are given by

The first of the above equation represents the continuity equation and the other two represent the momentum equations.

Taylor–Green vortex solution
In the domain , the solution is given by

where ,  being the kinematic viscosity of the fluid.

The pressure field  can be obtained by substituting the velocity solution in the momentum equations and is given by

The stream function of the Taylor–Green vortex solution, i.e. which satisfies  for flow velocity , is

Similarly, the vorticity, which satisfies , is given by

The Taylor–Green vortex solution may be used for testing and validation of temporal accuracy of Navier–Stokes algorithms.

A generalization of the Taylor–Green vortex solution in three dimensions in described in.

References

Fluid dynamics
Vortices
Computational fluid dynamics